The Csongrád-Csanád County Assembly is the local legislative body of Csongrád-Csanád County in the Southern Great Plain in Hungary.

Composition

2019
The Assembly elected at the 2019 local government elections, is made up of 20 counselors, with the following party composition:

|-
|colspan=8 align=center| 
|-
! colspan="2" | Party
! Votes
! %
! +/-
! Seats 
! +/-
! Seats %
|-
| bgcolor=| 
| align=left | Fidesz–KDNP
| align=right| 41,688
| align=right| 54.04
| align=right| 5.59
| align=right| 12
| align=right| 1
| align=right| 60.00
|-
| bgcolor=| 
| align=left | Hungarian Socialist Party (MSZP)
| align=right| 8,183
| align=right| 10.61
| align=right| 11.17
| align=right| 2
| align=right| 3
| align=right| 10.00
|-
| bgcolor=| 
| align=left | Jobbik
| align=right| 7,714
| align=right| 10.00
| align=right| 8.65
| align=right| 2
| align=right| 2
| align=right| 10.00
|-
| bgcolor=| 
| align=left | Our Homeland Movement (Mi Hazánk)
| align=right| 6,991
| align=right| 9.06
| align=right| 
| align=right| 2
| align=right| 2
| align=right| 10.00
|-
| bgcolor=| 
| align=left | Democratic Coalition (DK)
| align=right| 6,341
| align=right| 8.22
| align=right| 5.10
| align=right| 1
| align=right| 1
| align=right| 5.00
|-
| bgcolor=| 
| align=left | Momentum Movement (Momentum)
| align=right| 6,228
| align=right| 8.07
| align=right| 
| align=right| 1
| align=right| 1
| align=right| 5.00
|-
! align=right colspan=2| Total
! align=right| 80,042
! align=right| 100.0
! align=right| 
! align=right| 20
! align=right| 0
! align=right| 
|-
! align=right colspan=2| Voter turnout
! align=right| 
! align=right| 48.23
! align=right| 2.82
! align=right| 
! align=right| 
! align=right| 
|}

After the elections in 2019 the Assembly controlled by the Fidesz–KDNP party alliance which has 12 councillors, versus 2 Jobbik, 2 Hungarian Socialist Party (MSZP), 2 Our Homeland Movement (Mi Hazánk), 1 Momentum Movement and 1 Democratic Coalition (DK) councillors.

2014
The Assembly elected at the 2014 local government elections, is made up of 20 counselors, with the following party composition:

|-
! colspan="2" | Party
! Votes
! %
! +/-
! Seats 
! +/-
! Seats %
|-
| bgcolor=| 
| align=left | Fidesz–KDNP
| align=right| 36,165
| align=right| 48.45
| align=right| 5.53
| align=right| 11
| align=right| 1
| align=right| 55.00
|-
| bgcolor=| 
| align=left | Hungarian Socialist Party (MSZP)
| align=right| 16,254
| align=right| 21.78
| align=right| 5.32
| align=right| 5
| align=right| 1
| align=right| 25.00
|-
| bgcolor=| 
| align=left | Jobbik
| align=right| 13,922
| align=right| 18.65
| align=right| 6.67
| align=right| 4
| align=right| 2
| align=right| 20.00
|-
! colspan=8|
|-
| bgcolor=| 
| align=left | Politics Can Be Different (LMP)
| align=right| 2,956
| align=right| 3.96
| align=right| 
| align=right| 0
| align=right| ±0
| align=right| 0
|-
| bgcolor=| 
| align=left | Democratic Coalition (DK)
| align=right| 2,327
| align=right| 3.12
| align=right| 
| align=right| 0
| align=right| ±0
| align=right| 0
|-
| bgcolor=#808080| 
| align=left | Nagycsaládok Ruzsa
| align=right| 2,196
| align=right| 2.94
| align=right| 
| align=right| 0
| align=right| ±0
| align=right| 0
|-
| bgcolor=#FED500| 
| align=left | Together (Együtt)
| align=right| 822
| align=right| 1.10
| align=right| 
| align=right| 0
| align=right| ±0
| align=right| 0
|-
! align=right colspan=2| Total
! align=right| 77,431
! align=right| 100.0
! align=right| 
! align=right| 20
! align=right| 0
! align=right| 
|-
! align=right colspan=2| Voter turnout
! align=right| 
! align=right| 45.41
! align=right| 3.60
! align=right| 
! align=right| 
! align=right| 
|}

After the elections in 2014 the Assembly controlled by the Fidesz–KDNP party alliance which has 11 councillors, versus 5 Hungarian Socialist Party (MSZP) and 4 Jobbik councillors.

2010
The Assembly elected at the 2010 local government elections, is made up of 20 counselors, with the following party composition:

|-
! colspan="2" | Party
! Votes
! %
! +/-
! Seats 
! +/-
! Seats %
|-
| bgcolor=| 
| align=left | Fidesz–KDNP
| align=right| 43,712
| align=right| 53.98
| align=right| .
| align=right| 12
| align=right| 8
| align=right| 60.00
|-
| bgcolor=| 
| align=left | Hungarian Socialist Party (MSZP)
| align=right| 21,944
| align=right| 27.10
| align=right| .
| align=right| 6
| align=right| 10
| align=right| 30.00
|-
| bgcolor=| 
| align=left | Jobbik
| align=right| 9,698
| align=right| 11.98
| align=right| 
| align=right| 2
| align=right| 2
| align=right| 10.00
|-
! colspan=8|
|-
| bgcolor=#808080| 
| align=left | Association of Urban Builders (Városépítők)
| align=right| 3,671
| align=right| 4.53
| align=right| 
| align=right| 0
| align=right| ±0
| align=right| 0
|-
| bgcolor=#555555| 
| align=left | Civil Alliance for Makó (PSZM)
| align=right| 1,958
| align=right| 2.42
| align=right| 
| align=right| 0
| align=right| ±0
| align=right| 0
|-
! align=right colspan=2| Total
! align=right| 84,017
! align=right| 100.0
! align=right| 
! align=right| 20
! align=right| 20
! align=right| 
|-
! align=right colspan=2| Voter turnout
! align=right| 
! align=right| 49.01
! align=right| 
! align=right| 
! align=right| 
! align=right| 
|}

After the elections in 2010 the Assembly controlled by the Fidesz–KDNP party alliance which has 12 councillors, versus 6 Hungarian Socialist Party (MSZP) and 2 Jobbik councillors.

Presidents of the Assembly
So far, the presidents of the Csongrád-Csanád County Assembly have been:

 1990–1998 István Lehmann, Hungarian Socialist Party (MSZP)
 1998–2006 József Frank, Fidesz
 2006–2014 Anna Magyar, Fidesz–KDNP
 2014–2019 Béla Kakas, Fidesz–KDNP
 since 2019 László Gémes, Fidesz–KDNP

References 

Local government in Hungary
Csongrád-Csanád County